Calosoma chinense is a species of ground beetle in the subfamily of Carabinae. It was described by William Kirby in 1819.

References

chinense
Beetles described in 1819